Kuy-e Montazeri (also Romanized as Kūy-e Montaz̧erī) was a village in Kut-e Abdollah Rural District, in the Central District of Karun County, Khuzestan Province, Iran. At the 2006 census, its population was 1,145, in 182 families. The village was merged with 8 other into one city called Kut-e Abdollah.

References 

Former populated places in Karun County